Nigel Pierre (born 6 February 1979 in Saint Joseph) is a football striker from Trinidad and Tobago, who manages Westside Superstarz.

Career
"Pistol" Pierre as he was once known due to his fearsome shooting ability had a 3-month loan spell at Bristol Rovers F.C. in England in the 1999–2000 season but, after impressing, the move was unable to go through due to work permit problems. Former San Juan Jabloteh boss Terry Fenwick again tried to take him to England to play for Northampton Town F.C. but once again Pierre was denied as he had only played 73% of Trinidad and Tobago's matches and not the required minimum of 75%. He played for Caledonia AIA, having been sacked from both his previous clubs.

International career
He got 58 caps and scored 22 goals for the national team between 1999 and 2005.

Clubs
 Queen's Park CC (1998)
 Joe Public (1999) (14 goals)
 Bristol Rovers (2000) 3 apps. (0 goals)
 Joe Public (2000–2002) (24 goals)
 San Juan Jabloteh (2002) 1 app. (0 goals)
 Joe Public (2002–2003) (4 goals)
 San Juan Jabloteh (2003–2005) (9 goals)
 Joe Public (2005) (2nd Div.)
 Caledonia AIA (2005–2006) (5 goals)
 Joe Public (2007–2008) (2 goals)
 WASA Clean & White (2008) (2nd Div.)
 United Petrotrin (2009) 5 apps. (0 goals)
 Queen's Park CC (2010–) (2nd Div.)

References

1979 births
Living people
Trinidad and Tobago footballers
Association football forwards
Bristol Rovers F.C. players
Trinidad and Tobago international footballers
Joe Public F.C. players
San Juan Jabloteh F.C. players
TT Pro League players
Morvant Caledonia United players
2002 CONCACAF Gold Cup players